Kevin Foley may refer to:

 Kevin Foley (drummer) (born 1988), drummer
 Kevin Foley (footballer, born 1984), Republic of Ireland association footballer
 Kevin Foley (Gaelic footballer) (born 1960), Irish Gaelic footballer playing for County Meath
 Kevin Foley (golfer) (born 1987), American golfer
 Kevin Foley (hurler), Irish hurler
 Kevin Foley (South Australian politician) (born 1960), former South Australian politician
 Kevin Foley (Victorian politician) (born 1938), politician and academic